"Ayer" ("Yesterday") is a 1993 song by American singer and songwriter Gloria Estefan. It was released as her third promotional single (her seventh overall), from her first Spanish album, Mi Tierra. The song reached number 5 on the Billboard Hot Latin Songs chart. The promotional single was released exclusively to Latin radio stations in the United States and Argentina. At the same time, two other promotional singles were released in important countries of Spanish language, as "Volverás" in Mexico and "Mi Tierra De Tradición" in Spain.

Official versions
Original versions
 Album version – 5:15
 2020 version (on Brazil305) – 4:47

Charts

References

External links
 Lyrics with English translation
 Gloria Estefan Discography Database

1993 singles
1993 songs
Gloria Estefan songs
Spanish-language songs
Epic Records singles